Nabesna (Nabaesna’ in Ahtna; Naambia Niign Daacheeg in Upper Tanana) is a census-designated place and unincorporated community in northern Copper River Census Area, Alaska, United States, in the northern part of the Wrangell-St. Elias National Park and Preserve.  It lies along the Nabesna Road, a gravel road that connects it to the Tok Cut-Off at Slana.  Its elevation is 2,979 feet (908 m).  Founded by and named for the Nabesna Mining Company, the community received a post office in 1909.  Located at the base of White Mountain in the Wrangell Mountains, it lies west of the Nabesna River. According to the 2020 census, there were two people residing at this location.

Gold was discovered at White Mountain in 1891, and the site was first developed in the early 20th century. Through the efforts of Carl Whitham, the Nabesna Mining Company was formed in 1929, resulting in an expansion of the camp and the construction of Nabesna Road.  The mine was closed during World War II, and only briefly reopened afterward, closing permanently after Whitham died in 1947.  The location was used as a secret supply cache by the United States Army during the Cold War.  The mine produced  of gold during its active period, as well as many tons of silver, copper, and lead.

The old mining camp, now a ghost town, and the mine were listed as the Nabesna Gold Mine Historic District on the National Register of Historic Places in 1979.

Demographics

Nabesna first appeared on the 1930 U.S. Census as an unincorporated mining village. It appeared again in 1940 and 1950. It did not appear again until 2010, when it was made a census-designated place (CDP).

The Nabesna mining community is not to be confused with Nabesna native village, which was located west across the Nabesna River from present-day Northway Village (CDP). It also appeared on the 1940 U.S. Census showing 85 residents. There is some confusion as to which Nabesna appeared on the 1960 U.S. Census (showing 41 residents). The native village was reported to have flooded and residents left around 1950. Nabesna was merged with Northway on the 1950 census as "Northway-Nabesna." Some residents had earlier relocated from the native village upriver to the abandoned Reeve Airfield, adjacent to the Nabesna mining community after World War II. Owing to the 1960 U.S. Census map showing Nabesna native village still in existence adjacent to Northway, that is given credence, but further research may be needed due to confirm if this is not erroneous. Nothing remains of that native village as of the 2010s.

Climate
Nabesna has a continental subarctic climate (Köppen Dfc).

See also
National Register of Historic Places listings in Wrangell-St. Elias National Park and Preserve
National Register of Historic Places listings in Copper River Census Area, Alaska

References

Census-designated places in Alaska
Census-designated places in Copper River Census Area, Alaska
Census-designated places in Unorganized Borough, Alaska
Historic districts on the National Register of Historic Places in Alaska
Unincorporated communities in Alaska
Unincorporated communities in Copper River Census Area, Alaska
Unincorporated communities in Unorganized Borough, Alaska
Tanana Athabaskans
Ahtna